Herbert Ross Webbe (18 May 1856 – 9 May 1886) was an English first-class cricketer active 1875–81 who played for Middlesex, Marylebone Cricket Club (MCC) and Oxford University. He was born in Westminster, educated at New College, Oxford, and died in Paddington.

References

1856 births
1886 deaths
English cricketers
Marylebone Cricket Club cricketers
Oxford University cricketers
Non-international England cricketers
Alumni of New College, Oxford
Gentlemen of the South cricketers
Orleans Club cricketers
Gentlemen of England cricketers
I Zingari cricketers